Reginald Davis (22 October 1892 – 11 July 1957) was an Australian cricketer. He played four first-class matches for Tasmania between 1912 and 1915.

See also
 List of Tasmanian representative cricketers

References

External links
 

1892 births
1957 deaths
Australian cricketers
Tasmania cricketers
Cricketers from Tasmania